Saproscincus oriarius is a species of skink found in New South Wales in Australia.

References

Saproscincus
Reptiles described in 1998
Skinks of Australia
Endemic fauna of Australia
Taxa named by Ross Allen Sadlier